Anthony Van Loo (born 5 October 1988) is a Belgian retired football defender, who last played for Kortrijk in the Belgian First Division A.

Career
Around June 2008 he was diagnosed with a heart condition, but was allowed to resume his career after having a defibrillator implanted. A video clip showing Van Loo's defibrillator at work, shocking his heart back into a normal rhythm after he had suffered a cardiac arrhythmia during a match, was posted to YouTube on 8 June 2009.

In 2015, he drew interest from Zawisza Bydgoszcz. After his visit, he heavily criticised the club's management, training, and the accommodation he was given during his stay before announcing "Never again!". Officially the club stated that the reason for the transfer falling through was because he failed the medical.

Van Loo collapsed again in May 2018 in a match against Excel Mouscron. In November 2018 he concluded, after a medical visit, that although his recovery was going well, he would never be able to return to his former level of play, leading him to announce his retirement from football.

International

Van Loo was a member of Belgium's squad for the 2007–09 International Challenge Trophy.

References

External links

1988 births
Living people
Belgian footballers
Belgium under-21 international footballers
Belgian Pro League players
K.S.V. Roeselare players
K.V. Mechelen players
K.V. Kortrijk players
Association football defenders
People from Roeselare
Footballers from West Flanders